Eva Olga Clarke  (née Nathanová; born 29 April 1945) is a British-Czech Holocaust survivor and former college administrator known for her birth at Mauthausen concentration camp. She is a speaker for the Holocaust Educational Trust. Clarke combats modern day instances of racism and prejudice through sharing her family's experiences in the Holocaust.

Early life 

On 29 April 1945, after three years in the Theresienstadt ghetto, six months of slave labour in an armaments factory in Freiburg, Germany, and a 17-day train journey in an open coal car, Anka Nathanová arrived at the gates of Mauthausen concentration camp. She gave birth to her daughter, Eva Olga Clarke, on a cart there. Previously, when arriving at the Auschwitz concentration camp, the Nazi SS doctor Josef Mengele asked Nathanová if she was pregnant, to which she lied and replied no. The Americans arrived six days later, and an Army Signal Corps cameraman filmed the human wreckage as evidence of Nazi atrocities. He also filmed Nathanová with her new baby. Clarke's father, Bernd Nathan, a German-Jewish architect, was shot and killed on 18 January 1945, shortly before the liberation of Auschwitz concentration camp. Her brother Dan (George) was born in 1944 in the Theresienstadt ghetto and died of pneumonia at the age of two months.

The family moved to Prague to live with Nathanová's cousin. In February 1948, Clarke's mother married her old acquaintance, Karel Bergman, a Czech Jew who had escaped to the United Kingdom in 1939 and returned as a translator in the Royal Air Force.  Bergman adopted Clarke and the family left Prague in September 1948. Bergman found work in Pontypridd. The family relocated to Cardiff and later Cyncoed. Clarke attended Rhydypenau Primary School and Our Lady’s Convent School.

Career 
Clarke was a college administrator at Cambridge Regional College for 20 years. In 2000, she began speaking publicly of her family's experiences during the Holocaust. Clarke volunteers as a speaker for the Holocaust Educational Trust. She also supports the Anne Frank Trust and the Beth Shalom Holocaust Centre. In 2010, she attended the 65th anniversary of the liberation of Mauthausen. Clarke returned in May 2013 as one of 20 survivors invited by the Austrian government to attend the opening of a new exhibition. She is one of the three subjects of the book Born Survivors: Three Young Mothers and Their Extraordinary Story of Courage, Defiance and Hope (2015) by British writer Wendy Holden. In 2020, Clarke's birth certificate was on display at the Imperial War Museum. Through her testimonials, she hopes people learn from the Holocaust and combat modern day instances of racism and prejudice.

Personal life 
Clarke lived in Cardiff until she was 18. In the 1960s, she met and married Malcom Clarke, a lawyer from Abergavenny, and they had two sons. Clarke's father-in-law, Kenneth Clarke, was a navigator in RAF Bomber Command who participated in the bombing of Dresden while her mother, Anka Nathanová, was sheltering with other prisoners. , Clarke resides in Cambridge.

Awards and honors 
Clarke was one of four Holocaust survivors awarded the British Empire Medal in 2019 for their efforts to share testimonials of their experiences for future generations.

References

External links 

 
 

Living people
1945 births
People from Mauthausen
Mauthausen concentration camp survivors
People from Cardiff
British academic administrators
Women academic administrators
Czech Jews
Czechoslovak emigrants to the United Kingdom
British people of Czech-Jewish descent
British people of German-Jewish descent
Recipients of the British Empire Medal
21st-century British Jews
20th-century British Jews